LS5 may refer to:

 CS/LS5, a Chinese submachine gun
 Hongqi LS5, a 2015–2017 Chinese government-only full-size SUV
 Panasonic Lumix DMC-LS5, a digital camera
 Rolladen-Schneider LS5, a German single seat glider
 LS5, callsign of Radio Rivadavia, Argentina